Solanum aureum is a species of flowering plant in the family Solanaceae, native to Colombia, Ecuador and Peru. It was first described in 1816.

References

aureum
Flora of Colombia
Flora of Ecuador
Flora of Peru
Plants described in 1816